Communio is a federation of theological journals, founded in 1972 by Joseph Ratzinger, Hans Urs von Balthasar, Henri de Lubac, Walter Kasper, Marc Ouellet, Louis Bouyer, and others. Communio, now published in fifteen editions (including German, English and Spanish), has become one of the most important journals of Catholic thought. The journals are independently edited, but also publish translations of each other's articles. 

It is often considered to be the sister publication and theological rival to the journal Concilium, which was founded in 1965 intending to keep the "spirit of Vatican II" in the Catholic Church after the sessions of the Second Vatican Council had ended.

See also
Nouvelle Théologie

References
 Sage Press
 Journal search
 Library of Congress

External links
Communio: International Catholic Review

Catholic theology and doctrine
Catholic studies journals
Multilingual journals
Publications established in 1972